"Baby Ain't That Fine" is a song written by Dallas Frazier that was recorded as a duet between American country artists Melba Montgomery and Gene Pitney. The song was also released as a single in 1965.

"Baby Ain't That Fine" was recorded in October 1965 in Nashville, Tennessee, United States. The session was produced by Pappy Daily. It was the first recording session to take place between Montgomery and Pitney. The session included The Nashville A-Team of musicians.

The song was issued as the duo's first single together in November 1965 via Musicor Records. The single peaked at number fifteen on the Billboard Magazine Hot Country Singles chart in early 1966. It was the pair's first and only major hit duet recording together and was issued onto the studio album Being Together (1966).

Chart performance

References 

1965 singles
1965 songs
Male–female vocal duets
Songs written by Dallas Frazier
Gene Pitney songs
Melba Montgomery songs
Musicor Records singles
Song recordings produced by Pappy Daily